Princeton Township is a township in Scott County, Iowa, USA.  As of the 2000 census, its population was 1,466.

Geography
According to the USGS, it contains five cemeteries: Fessler, Nowlin, Oak Ridge, Princeton City and Salem.

The streams of Bud Creek, Cordova Slough, Old Channel Lost Creek, South Fork Lost Creek, Wapsipinicon River and Whiskey Run Creek run through this township.

References
 USGS Geographic Names Information System (GNIS)

External links
 US-Counties.com
 City-Data.com

Townships in Scott County, Iowa
Townships in Iowa